Alice's Adventures in Wonderland retold in words of one syllable  is a retelling by Mrs. J. C. Gorham of Lewis Carroll's 1865 novel, written in 1905 and published by A. L. Burt of New York. It is part of Burt's Series of One Syllable Books, which was "selected specially for young people's reading, and told in simple language for youngest readers". The series included such works as Aesop's Fables, Anderson's Fairy Tales, Bible Heroes, Grimm's Fairy Tales, The Life of Christ, Lives of the Presidents, Pilgrim's Progress, Reynard the Fox, Robinson Crusoe, Sanford and Merton, and Swiss Family Robinson.

Gorham re-told Gulliver's Travels in 1896, and Black Beauty in 1905.

The book features the original illustrations by John Tenniel.

Sample text

Bibliography
Carroll, Lewis (2010) Alice's Adventures in Wonderland retold in words of one syllable by Mrs J. C. Gorham. Evertype.

External links

1905 American novels
1905 fantasy novels
Books based on Alice in Wonderland
Children's fantasy novels
Constrained writing
1905 children's books